Efe Ergi Tırpancı (born January 1, 2000) is a Turkish professional basketball player for Pınar Karşıyaka of the Basketbol Süper Ligi (BSL).

References

External links
Ergi Tırpancı Euroleague.net Profile
Ergi Tırpancı TBLStat.net Profile
Ergi Tırpancı Eurobasket Profile
Ergi Tırpancı TBL Profile

Living people
2000 births
Afyonkarahisar Belediyespor players
Karşıyaka basketball players
OGM Ormanspor players
Small forwards
Sportspeople from Ankara
Turkish men's basketball players
Yalovaspor BK players